Copper homeostasis protein cutC homolog is a protein that in humans is encoded by the CUTC gene.

References

External links

Further reading